Tunisia competed in the Summer Olympic Games for the first time at the 1960 Summer Olympics in Rome, Italy. 42 competitors, all men, took part in 22 events in 7 sports.

Athletics

Men
Track & road events

Field events

Boxing

Men

Cycling

Four male cyclists represented Tunisia in 1960
Road

Fencing

Four fencers represented Tunisia in 1960.

Men's foil
 Norbert Brami
 Jean Khayat
 Raoul Barouch

Men's épée
 Ali Annabi
 Raoul Barouch
 Norbert Brami

Men's sabre
 Raoul Barouch
 Jean Khayat
 Ali Annabi

Football

First round

Group C

Modern pentathlon

Three male pentathletes represented Tunisia in 1960.

Shooting

Two shooters represented Tunisia in 1960.
Men

References

External links
Official Olympic Reports

Nations at the 1960 Summer Olympics
1960
1960 in Tunisian sport